NBC 13 may refer to one of the following television stations in the United States:

Current affiliates
KCWY-DT in Casper, Wyoming
KECI-TV in Missoula, Montana, a part of NBC Montana
KHNL in Honolulu, Hawaii
KOGG (Wailuku satellite station)
KSIX-TV (Hilo satellite station)
WEAU in Eau Claire, Wisconsin
WHO-DT in Des Moines, Iowa
WNYT in Albany, New York
WREX in Rockford, Illinois
WTHR in Indianapolis, Indiana
WVTM-TV in Birmingham, Alabama

Formerly affiliated
KBLU-TV/KYEL-TV (now KYMA-DT) in Yuma, Arizona / El Centro, California (1970 to 1991)
KHAR-TV (now KYUR) in Anchorage, Alaska (1970 to 1971)
KMO-TV (now KCPQ) in Seattle, Washington (1953 to 1954)
KRDO-TV in Colorado Springs, Colorado (1953 to 1960)
KSFY in Sioux Falls, South Dakota (1960 to 1983)
KVAL-TV in Eugene, Oregon (1954 to 1982)
WMBB in Panama City, Florida (1973 to 1982)
WTVG in Toledo, Ohio (1948 to 1995)